Snout were an Australian independent rock band who were formed in Melbourne in 1991 and disbanded in 2002. They released numerous recordings and were twice nominated for an Australian Record Industry Association Award. Ross McLennan, the founder of the band, has since gone on as a solo artist who has been nominated for the Australian Music Prize. Anthony Paine, has also gone on to be nominated for this award, with the group Black Cab.

History
Founded by Ross McLennan in Melbourne, Australia in 1991. Snout made their first recorded appearance the following year on a Half a Cow Records compilation, Slice Two They went on to be a fixture of the Australian independent music scene until their demise in 2002.

The band's first release in their own right was in 1993 with the Cleans and Brightens EP, through the Au Go Go label. In 1994 they released their debut album, What's That Sound?

The lineup at this time consisted of Ross McLennan (Bass and vocals), Rob Wolf (Guitar and backing vocals) and Hugh Williams (Drums).

Soon after the recording of What's That Sound?, Rob and Hugh left the band. McLennan recruited Greg Ng for guitar and backing vocal duties. Ng had previously fronted Melbourne shoegaze exponents Afterglow. New drummer, Ewan McCartney had previously performed with Ripe.

This combination recorded the band's most successful releases; The New Pop Dialogue (1996) and Circle High and Wide (1998).

This lineup remained stable until 1999, when Ng left the band and was replaced by Anthony Paine, of High Pass Filter, who played guitar on the band's final album, Managing Good Looks (2001). This album was released on W.Minc Productions, run by Graham Lee (The Triffids) and Steve Miller (The Moodists). Two tracks featured Rebecca Barnard on backing vocals.

Snout played extensively on the live circuit in Australia, leaving Melbourne regularly to tour in their own right and with other prominent names of the era. They also played festivals such as The Big Day Out, Falls Festival, Sunny Sedgewick, Livid and Meredith Music Festival.

Snout played their final gig in November 2002, in Melbourne at the Rob Roy Hotel.

During the 2010 Australian Federal election campaign, Australian Greens candidate Adam Bandt, professed that "I am a fan of jangle-pop bands like Bidston Moss, Underground Lovers, Ross McLennan and Snout,"

Side Projects
During the band's existence, McCartney worked on the side projects The Grapes (with Ashley Naylor and Sherry Rich) and as a member of Dan Brodie & the Broken Arrows. Meanwhile, Paine could be found playing with The Hired Guns. McLennan also teamed up with his brother Link, front man of The Meanies to form the lo-fi duo, Meuscram.

Post break-up
After the demise of the band, Ross McLennan, released material as a solo artist. Notably, his album Sympathy for the New World was nominated for the 2008 Australian Music Prize.

Greg Ng released the hip-hop inspired, Straight Out of M-Town under the name DCP. Ewan McCartney went on to drum with The Bakelite Age. Meanwhile, Paine can be found building and repairing guitars under the name Harvester Guitars as well as continuing to be involved with bands. Notably, Black Cab who were nominated for the Australian Music Prize in 2009. Rob Wolf moved to Queensland and works for John Deere tractors. Hugh Williams is a former vice president at Google and a Professor at the Melbourne Business School.

Discography

Studio albums

Extended plays

Appearances on Compilations
Penicillin – "Idiot Box" Original Soundtrack (1996)
Karen – "Right Here – A Tribute to the Go-Betweens"

Awards and nominations

ARIA Music Awards
The ARIA Music Awards is an annual awards ceremony that recognises excellence, innovation, and achievement across all genres of Australian music.

|-
| 1997
| The New Pop Dialogue
| rowspan="2"| Best Pop Release
| 
|-
| 1998
| Circle High and Wide
| 
|-

References

References
Saul, Shiralee ABC Arts - "Feature: Dreamers and Dealers" Australian Broadcasting Corporation, 29 August 2001. Retrieved 2010-09-11
Half a Cow Records. "Various Artists-Slice Two". Retrieved 2010-09-11.
Benedictus, Luke. "A Bit of Calm in the Playground" The Age, Melbourne, 13 June 2004.

J Play website. "Snout Biography" Retrieved 2010-09-11.
Big Day Out festival website. "PAST LINEUPS". Retrieved 2010-09-11.
Falls Festival Website. "The Falls Music & Arts Festival | 1996" Retrieved 2010-09-11.
Meredith Music Festival Website. "History · The 19th Meredith Music Festival". Retrieved 2010-09-11.
Mihelakos, Mary and Roberts, Jo. "Aunty Meredith gets a bit Dirty|Greens launch at the Tote" The Age, Melbourne, 10 August 2010.
Triple J Radio "1996 | history | triple j hottest 100 - 2008 | triple j". Retrieved 2010-09-11.
ARIA Awards website, History: Winners by Year. "11th Annual ARIA Awards". Retrieved 2010-09-11.
ARIA Awards website, History: Winners by Year. "12th Annual ARIA Awards". Retrieved 2010-09-11.
Donovan, Patrick. "Rob roy's birthday" The Age, Melbourne, 20 June 2003.
Last Call Records. "DAN BRODIE Empty Arms Broken Hearts". Retrieved 2010-09-11.
Donovan, Patrick. "Brave heart". The Age, Melbourne, 26 July 2002.
MP3.com "DCP | Hip Hop Music, Melbourne". Retrieved 2010-09-11.
Au Go Go Records.  "Snout" Retrieved 2010-09-11.
The 6th Australian Music Prize. "2009 Shortlist « The Australian Music Prize". Retrieved 2010-09-11.
Au Go Go Records. "Discography". Retrieved 2010-009-11.
Red Eye Records. "Answer Page" Retrieved 2010-09-11.
IMDB Soundtrack listing. "Idiot Box (1996) - Soundtracks". Retrieved 2010-09-11.
Amazon.com. Track listing of the "Right Here" compilation. "Amazon.com: Right Here: A Go-Betweens Tribute: Various Artists: Music". Retrieved 2010-09-11.
Zuel, Bernard. "Inside story on the Australian Music Prize". The Vine, 20 March 2009.
Mess and Noise. "Black Cab To Make Brisbane Bow". 1 June 2010.

Australian indie rock groups
Musical groups established in 1991
Musical groups disestablished in 2002
Victoria (Australia) musical groups
1991 establishments in Australia
Au Go Go Records artists